Supplementary Reserve may refer to:
 The Canadian Forces Supplementary Reserve
 A historical subdivision of the Militia of the United Kingdom
 The Supplementary Order of Battle in Canada